ZETA, short for Zero Energy Thermonuclear Assembly, was a major experiment in the early history of fusion power research. Based on the pinch plasma confinement technique, and built at the Atomic Energy Research Establishment in the United Kingdom, ZETA was larger and more powerful than any fusion machine in the world at that time. Its goal was to produce large numbers of fusion reactions, although it was not large enough to produce net energy.

ZETA went into operation in August 1957 and by the end of the month it was giving off bursts of about a million neutrons per pulse. Measurements suggested the fuel was reaching between 1 and 5 million kelvins, a temperature that would produce nuclear fusion reactions, explaining the quantities of neutrons being seen. Early results were leaked to the press in September 1957, and the following January an extensive review was released. Front-page articles in newspapers around the world announced it as a breakthrough towards unlimited energy, a scientific advance for Britain greater than the recently launched Sputnik had been for the Soviet Union.

US and Soviet experiments had also given off similar neutron bursts at temperatures that were not high enough for fusion. This led Lyman Spitzer to express his scepticism of the results, but his comments were dismissed by UK observers as jingoism. Further experiments on ZETA showed that the original temperature measurements were misleading; the bulk temperature was too low for fusion reactions to create the number of neutrons being seen. The claim that ZETA had produced fusion had to be publicly withdrawn, an embarrassing event that cast a chill over the entire fusion establishment. The neutrons were later explained as being the product of instabilities in the fuel. These instabilities appeared inherent to any similar design, and work on the basic pinch concept as a road to fusion power ended by 1961.

In spite of ZETA's failure to achieve fusion, the device went on to have a long experimental lifetime and produced numerous important advances in the field. In one line of development, the use of lasers to more accurately measure the temperature was tested on ZETA, and was later used to confirm the results of the Soviet tokamak approach. In another, while examining ZETA test runs it was noticed that the plasma self-stabilised after the power was turned off. This has led to the modern reversed field pinch concept. More generally, studies of the instabilities in ZETA have led to several important theoretical advances that form the basis of modern plasma theory.

Conceptual development 
The basic understanding of nuclear fusion was developed during the 1920s as physicists explored the new science of quantum mechanics. George Gamow's 1928 exploration of quantum tunnelling demonstrated that nuclear reactions could take place at lower energies than classical theory predicted. Using this theory, in 1929 Fritz Houtermans and Robert Atkinson demonstrated that expected reaction rates in the core of the Sun supported Arthur Eddington's 1920 suggestion that the Sun is powered by fusion.

In 1934, Mark Oliphant, Paul Harteck and Ernest Rutherford were the first to achieve fusion on Earth, using a particle accelerator to shoot deuterium nuclei into a metal foil containing deuterium, lithium or other elements. This allowed them to measure the nuclear cross section of various fusion reactions, and determined that the deuterium-deuterium reaction occurred at a lower energy than other reactions, peaking at about 100,000 electronvolts (100 keV).

This energy corresponds to the average energy of particles in a gas heated to thousands of millions of kelvins. Materials heated beyond a few tens of thousands of kelvins dissociate into their electrons and nuclei, producing a gas-like state of matter known as plasma. In any gas the particles have a wide range of energies, normally following the Maxwell–Boltzmann statistics. In such a mixture, a small number of particles will have much higher energy than the bulk.

This leads to an interesting possibility; even at temperatures well below 100,000 eV, some particles will randomly have enough energy to undergo fusion. Those reactions release huge amounts of energy. If that energy can be captured back into the plasma, it can heat other particles to that energy as well, making the reaction self-sustaining. In 1944, Enrico Fermi calculated this would occur at about 50,000,000 K.

Confinement 

Taking advantage of this possibility requires the fuel plasma to be held together long enough that these random reactions have time to occur. Like any hot gas, the plasma has an internal pressure and thus tends to expand according to the ideal gas law. For a fusion reactor, the problem is keeping the plasma contained against this pressure; any known physical container would melt at these temperatures.

A plasma is electrically conductive, and is subject to electric and magnetic fields. In a magnetic field, the electrons and nuclei orbit the magnetic field lines. A simple confinement system is a plasma-filled tube placed inside the open core of a solenoid. The plasma naturally wants to expand outwards to the walls of the tube, as well as move along it, towards the ends. The solenoid creates a magnetic field running down the centre of the tube, which the particles will orbit, preventing their motion towards the sides. Unfortunately, this arrangement does not confine the plasma along the length of the tube, and the plasma is free to flow out the ends.

The obvious solution to this problem is to bend the tube around into a torus (a ring or doughnut shape). Motion towards the sides remains constrained as before, and while the particles remain free to move along the lines, in this case, they will simply circulate around the long axis of the tube. But, as Fermi pointed out, when the solenoid is bent into a ring, the electrical windings would be closer together on the inside than the outside. This would lead to an uneven field across the tube, and the fuel will slowly drift out of the centre. Some additional force needs to counteract this drift, providing long-term confinement.

Pinch concept 

A potential solution to the confinement problem had been detailed in 1934 by Willard Harrison Bennett. Any electrical current creates a magnetic field, and due to the Lorentz force, this causes an inward directed force. This was first noticed in lightning rods. Bennett showed that the same effect would cause a current to "self-focus" a plasma into a thin column. A second paper by Lewi Tonks in 1937 considered the issue again, introducing the name "pinch effect". It was followed by a paper by Tonks and William Allis.

Applying a pinch current in a plasma can be used to counteract expansion and confine the plasma. A simple way to do this is to put the plasma in a linear tube and pass a current through it using electrodes at either end, like a fluorescent lamp. This arrangement still produces no confinement along the length of the tube, so the plasma flows onto the electrodes, rapidly eroding them. This is not a problem for a purely experimental machine, and there are ways to reduce the rate. Another solution is to place a magnet next to the tube; when the magnetic field changes, the fluctuations cause an electric current to be induced in the plasma. The major advantage of this arrangement is that there are no physical objects within the tube, so it can be formed into a torus and allow the plasma to circulate freely.

The toroidal pinch concept as a route to fusion was explored in the UK during the mid-1940s, especially by George Paget Thomson of Imperial College London. With the formation of the Atomic Energy Research Establishment (AERE) at Harwell, Oxfordshire, in 1945, Thomson repeatedly petitioned the director, John Cockcroft, for funds to develop an experimental machine. These requests were turned down. At the time there was no obvious military use, so the concept was left unclassified. This allowed Thomson and Moses Blackman to file a patent on the idea in 1946, describing a device using just enough pinch current to ionise and briefly confine the plasma while being heated by a microwave source that would also continually drive the current.

As a practical device there is an additional requirement, that the reaction conditions last long enough to burn a reasonable amount of the fuel. In the original Thomson and Blackman design, it was the job of the microwave injection to drive the electrons to maintain the current and produce pinches that lasted on the order of one minute, allowing the plasma to reach 500 million K. The current in the plasma also heated it; if the current was also used as the heat source, the only limit to the heating was the power of the pulse. This led to a new reactor design where the system operated in brief but very powerful pulses. Such a machine would demand a very large power supply.

First machines 
In 1947, Cockcroft arranged a meeting of several Harwell physicists to study Thomson's latest concepts, including Harwell's director of theoretical physics, Klaus Fuchs. Thomson's concepts were poorly received, especially by Fuchs. When this presentation also failed to gain funding, Thomson passed along his concepts to two graduate students at Imperial, Stanley (Stan) W. Cousins and Alan Alfred Ware (1924-2010). He added a report on a type of toroidal particle accelerator known as the "Wirbelrohr" ("whirl tube"), designed in Germany by Max Steenbeck. The Wirbelrohr consisted of a transformer with a torus-shaped vacuum tube as its secondary coil, similar in concept to the toroidal pinch devices.

Later that year, Ware built a small machine out of old radar equipment and was able to induce powerful currents. When they did, the plasma gave off flashes of light, but he could not devise a way to measure the temperature of the plasma. Thomson continued to pressure the government to allow him to build a full-scale device, using his considerable political currency to argue for the creation of a dedicated experimental station at the Associated Electrical Industries (AEI) lab that had recently been constructed at Aldermaston.

Ware discussed the experiments with anyone who was interested, including Jim Tuck of Clarendon Laboratory at Oxford University. While working at Los Alamos during the war, Tuck and Stanislaw Ulam had built an unsuccessful fusion system using shaped charge explosives, but it did not work. Tuck was joined by Australian Peter Thonemann, who had worked on fusion theory, and the two arranged funding through Clarendon to build a small device like the one at Imperial. But before this work started, Tuck was offered a job in the US, eventually returning to Los Alamos.

Thonemann continued working on the idea and began a rigorous programme to explore the basic physics of plasmas in a magnetic field. Starting with linear tubes and mercury gas, he found that the current tended to expand outward through the plasma until it touched the walls of the container (see skin effect). He countered this with the addition of small electromagnets outside the tube, which pushed back against the current and kept it centred. By 1949, he had moved on from the glass tubes to a larger copper torus, in which he was able to demonstrate a stable pinched plasma. Frederick Lindemann and Cockcroft visited and were duly impressed.

Cockcroft asked Herbert Skinner to review the concepts, which he did in April 1948. He was sceptical of Thomson's ideas for creating a current in the plasma and thought Thonemann's ideas seemed more likely to work. He also pointed out that the behaviour of plasmas in a magnetic field was not well understood, and that "it is useless to do much further planning before this doubt is resolved."

Meanwhile, at Los Alamos, Tuck acquainted the US researchers with the British efforts. In early 1951, Lyman Spitzer introduced his stellarator concept and was shopping the idea around the nuclear establishment looking for funding. Tuck was sceptical of Spitzer's enthusiasm and felt his development programme was "incredibly ambitious". He proposed a much less aggressive programme based on pinch. Both men presented their ideas in Washington in May 1951, which resulted in the Atomic Energy Commission giving Spitzer US$50,000. Tuck convinced Norris Bradbury, the director of Los Alamos, to give him US$50,000 from the discretionary budget, using it to build the Perhapsatron.

Early results 

In 1950 Fuchs admitted to passing UK and US atomic secrets to the USSR. As fusion devices generated high energy neutrons, which could be used to enrich nuclear fuel for bombs, the UK immediately classified all their fusion research. This meant the teams could no longer work in the open environment of the universities. The Imperial team under Ware moved to the AEI labs at Aldermaston and the Oxford team under Thonemann moved to Harwell.

By early 1952 there were numerous pinch devices in operation; Cousins and Ware had built several follow-on machines under the name Sceptre, and the Harwell team had built a series of ever-larger machines known as Mark I through Mark IV. In the US, Tuck built his Perhapsatron in January 1952. It was later learned that Fuchs had passed the UK work to the Soviets, and that they had started a fusion programme as well.

It was clear to all of these groups that something was seriously wrong in the pinch machines. As the current was applied, the plasma column inside the vacuum tube would become unstable and break up, ruining the compression. Further work identified two types of instabilities, nicknamed "kink" and "sausage". In the kink, the normally toroidal plasma would bend to the sides, eventually touching the edges of the vessel. In the sausage, the plasma would neck down at locations along the plasma column to form a pattern similar to a link of sausages.

Investigations demonstrated both were caused by the same underlying mechanism. When the pinch current was applied, any area of the gas that had a slightly higher density would create a slightly stronger magnetic field and collapse faster than the surrounding gas. This caused the localised area to have higher density, which created an even stronger pinch, and a runaway reaction would follow. The quick collapse in a single area would cause the whole column to break up.

Stabilised pinch 

Early studies of the phenomenon suggested one solution to the problem was to increase the compression rate. In this approach, the compression would be started and stopped so rapidly that the bulk of the plasma would not have time to move; instead, a shock wave created by this rapid compression would be responsible for compressing the majority of the plasma. This approach became known as fast pinch. The Los Alamos team working on the Columbus linear machine designed an updated version to test this theory.

Others started looking for ways to stabilise the plasma during compression, and by 1953 two concepts had come to the fore. One solution was to wrap the vacuum tube in a sheet of thin but highly conductive metal. If the plasma column began to move, the current in the plasma would induce a magnetic field in the sheet, one that, due to Lenz's law, would push back against the plasma. This was most effective against large, slow movements, like the entire plasma torus drifting within the chamber.

The second solution used additional electromagnets wrapped around the vacuum tube. The magnetic fields from these magnets mixed with the pinch field created by the current in the plasma. The result was that the paths of the particles within the plasma tube were no longer purely circular around the torus, but twisted like the stripes on a barber's pole. In the US, this concept was known as giving the plasma a "backbone", suppressing small-scale, localised instabilities. Calculations showed that this stabilised pinch would dramatically improve confinement times, and the older concepts "suddenly seemed obsolete".

Marshall Rosenbluth, recently arrived at Los Alamos, began a detailed theoretical study of the pinch concept. With his wife Arianna W. Rosenbluth and Richard Garwin, he developed "motor theory", or "M-theory", published in 1954. The theory predicted that the heating effect of the electric current was greatly increased with the power of the electric field. This suggested that the fast pinch concept would be more likely to succeed, as it was easier to produce larger currents in these devices. When he incorporated the idea of stabilising magnets into the theory a second phenomenon appeared; for a particular, and narrow, set of conditions based on the physical size of the reactor, the power of the stabilising magnets and the amount of pinch, toroidal machines appeared to be naturally stable.

ZETA begins construction 

US researchers planned to test both fast pinch and stabilised pinch by modifying their existing small-scale machines. In the UK, Thomson once again pressed for funding for a larger machine. This time he was much more warmly received, and initial funding of £200,000 was provided in late 1954. Design work continued during 1955, and in July the project was named ZETA. The term "zero energy" was a phrase used in the nuclear industry to refer to small research reactors, like ZEEP, which had a role similar to ZETA's goal of producing reactions while releasing no net energy.

The ZETA design was finalised in early 1956. Metropolitan-Vickers was hired to build the machine, which included a 150 tonne pulse transformer, the largest built in Britain to that point. A serious issue arose when the required high-strength steels needed for the electrical components were in short supply, but a strike in the US electrical industry caused a sudden glut of material, resolving the problem.

ZETA was the largest and most powerful fusion device in the world at the time of its construction. It was also the most powerful design, incorporating an induction magnet that was designed to induce currents up to 100,000 amperes (amps) into the plasma. Later amendments to the design increased this to 200,000 amps. It included both types of stabilisation; its aluminium walls acted as the metal shield, and a series of secondary magnets ringed the torus. Windows placed in the gaps between the toroidal magnets allowed direct inspection of the plasma.

In July 1954, the AERE was reorganised into the United Kingdom Atomic Energy Authority (UKAEA). Modifications to Harwell's Hangar 7 in order to house the machine began that year. Despite its advanced design, the price tag was modest: about US$1 million. By late 1956 it was clear that ZETA was going to come online in mid-1957, beating the Model C stellarator and the newest versions of the Perhapsatron and Columbus. Because these projects were secret, based on the little information available the press concluded they were versions of the same conceptual device, and that the British were far ahead in the race to produce a working machine.

Soviet visit and the push to declassify 

From 1953 the US had increasingly concentrated on the fast pinch concept. Some of these machines had produced neutrons, and these were initially associated with fusion. There was so much excitement that several other researchers quickly entered the field as well. Among these was Stirling Colgate, but his experiments quickly led him to conclude that fusion was not taking place. According to Spitzer resistivity, the temperature of the plasma could be determined from the current flowing through it. When Colgate performed the calculation, the temperatures in the plasma were far below the requirements for fusion.

This being the case, some other effect had to be creating the neutrons. Further work demonstrated that these were the result of instabilities in the fuel. The localised areas of high magnetic field acted as tiny particle accelerators, causing reactions that ejected neutrons. Modifications attempting to reduce these instabilities failed to improve the situation and by 1956 the fast pinch concept had largely been abandoned. The US labs began turning their attention to the stabilised pinch concept, but by this time ZETA was almost complete and the US was well behind.

In 1956, while planning a well publicised state visit by Nikita Khrushchev and Nikolai Bulganin to the UK, the Harwell researchers received an offer from Soviet scientist Igor Kurchatov to give a talk. They were surprised when he began his talk on "the possibility of producing thermonuclear reactions in a gaseous discharge". Kurchatov's speech revealed the Soviet efforts to produce fast pinch devices similar to the American designs, and their problems with instabilities in the plasmas. Kurchatov noted that they had also seen neutrons being released, and had initially believed them to be from fusion. But as they examined the numbers, it became clear the plasma was not hot enough and they concluded the neutrons were from other interactions.

Kurchatov's speech made it apparent that the three countries were all working on the same basic concepts and had all encountered the same sorts of problems. Cockcroft missed Kurchatov's visit because he had left for the US to press for declassification of the fusion work to avoid this duplication of effort. There was a widespread belief on both sides of the Atlantic that sharing their findings would greatly improve progress. Now that it was known the Soviets were at the same basic development level, and that they were interested in talking about it publicly, the US and UK began considering releasing much of their information as well. This developed into a wider effort to release all fusion research at the second Atoms for Peace conference in Geneva in September 1958.

In June 1957 the UK and US finalised their agreement to release data to each other sometime prior to the conference, which both the UK and the US planned on attending "in force". The final terms were reached on 27 November 1957, opening the projects to mutual inspection, and calling for a wide public release of all the data in January 1958.

Promising results 

ZETA started operation in mid-August 1957, initially with hydrogen. These runs demonstrated that ZETA was not suffering from the same stability problems that earlier pinch machines had seen and their plasmas were lasting for milliseconds, up from microseconds, a full three orders of magnitude improvement. The length of the pulses allowed the plasma temperature to be measured using spectrographic means; although the light emitted was broadband, the Doppler shifting of the spectral lines of slight impurities in the gas (oxygen in particular) led to calculable temperatures.

Even in early experimental runs, the team started introducing deuterium gas into the mix and began increasing the current to 200,000 amps. On the evening of 30 August the machine produced huge numbers of neutrons, on the order of one million per experimental pulse, or "shot". An effort to duplicate the results and eliminate possible measurement failure followed.

Much depended on the temperature of the plasma; if the temperature was low, the neutrons would not be fusion related. Spectrographic measurements suggested plasma temperatures between 1 and 5 million K; at those temperatures the predicted rate of fusion was within a factor of two of the number of neutrons being seen. It appeared that ZETA had reached the long-sought goal of producing small numbers of fusion reactions, as it was designed to do.

US efforts had suffered a string of minor technical setbacks that delayed their experiments by about a year; both the new Perhapsatron S-3 and Columbus II did not start operating until around the same time as ZETA in spite of being much smaller experiments. Nevertheless, as these experiments came online in mid-1957, they too began generating neutrons. By September, both these machines and a new design, DCX at Oak Ridge National Laboratory, appeared so promising that Edward Gardner reported that:

Prestige politics 

The news was too good to keep bottled up. Tantalising leaks started appearing in September. In October, Thonemann, Cockcroft and William P. Thompson hinted that interesting results would be following. In November a UKAEA spokesman noted "The indications are that fusion has been achieved". Based on these hints, the Financial Times dedicated an entire two-column article to the issue. Between then and early 1958, the British press published an average of two articles a week on ZETA. Even the US papers picked up the story; on 17 November The New York Times reported on the hints of success.

Although the British and US had agreed to release their data in full, at this point the overall director of the US program, Lewis Strauss, decided to hold back the release. Tuck argued that the field looked so promising that it would be premature to release any data before the researchers knew that fusion was definitely taking place. Strauss agreed, and announced that they would withhold their data for a period to check their results.

As the matter became better known in the press, on 26 November the publication issue was raised in House of Commons. Responding to a question by the opposition, the leader of the house announced the results publicly while explaining the delay in publication due to the UK–US agreement. The UK press interpreted this differently, claiming that the US was dragging its feet because it was unable to replicate the British results.

Things came to a head on 12 December when a former member of parliament, Anthony Nutting, wrote a New York Herald Tribune article claiming:

The article resulted in a flurry of activity in the Macmillan administration. Having originally planned to release their results at a scheduled meeting of the Royal Society, there was great concern over whether to invite the Americans and Soviets, especially as they believed the Americans would be greatly upset if the Soviets arrived, but just as upset if they were not invited and the event was all-British. The affair eventually led to the UKAEA making a public announcement that the US was not holding back the ZETA results, but this infuriated the local press, which continued to claim the US was delaying to allow them to catch up.

Early concerns 

When the information-sharing agreement was signed in November a further benefit was realised: teams from the various labs were allowed to visit each other. The US team, including Stirling Colgate, Lyman Spitzer, Jim Tuck and Arthur Edward Ruark, all visited ZETA and concluded there was a "major probability" the neutrons were from fusion.

On his return to the US, Spitzer calculated that something was wrong with the ZETA results. He noticed that the apparent temperature, 5 million K, would not have time to develop during the short firing times. ZETA did not discharge enough energy into the plasma to heat it to those temperatures so quickly. If the temperature was increasing at the relatively slow rate his calculations suggested, fusion would not be taking place early in the reaction, and could not be adding energy that might make up the difference. Spitzer suspected the temperature reading was not accurate. Since it was the temperature reading that suggested the neutrons were from fusion, if the temperature was lower, it implied the neutrons were non-fusion in origin.

Colgate had reached similar conclusions. In early 1958, he, Harold Furth and John Ferguson started an extensive study of the results from all known pinch machines. Instead of inferring temperature from neutron energy, they used the conductivity of the plasma itself, based on the well-understood relationships between temperature and conductivity. They concluded that the machines were producing temperatures perhaps  what the neutrons were suggesting, nowhere near hot enough to explain the number of neutrons being produced, regardless of their energy.

By this time the latest versions of the US pinch devices, Perhapsatron S-3 and Columbus S-4, were producing neutrons of their own. The fusion research world reached a high point. In January, results from pinch experiments in the US and UK both announced that neutrons were being released, and that fusion had apparently been achieved. The misgivings of Spitzer and Colgate were ignored.

Public release, worldwide interest 

The long-planned release of fusion data was announced to the public in mid-January. Considerable material from the UK's ZETA and Sceptre devices was released in depth in the 25 January 1958 edition of Nature, which also included results from Los Alamos' Perhapsatron S-3, Columbus II and Columbus S-2. The UK press was livid. The Observer wrote that "Admiral Strauss' tactics have soured what should be an exciting announcement of scientific progress so that it has become a sordid episode of prestige politics."

The results were typical of the normally sober scientific language, and although the neutrons were noted, there were no strong claims as to their source. The day before the release, Cockcroft, the overall director at Harwell, called a press conference to introduce the British press to the results. Some indication of the importance of the event can be seen in the presence of a BBC television field crew, a rare occurrence at that time. He began by introducing the fusion programme and the ZETA machine, and then noted:

The reporters at the meeting were not satisfied with this assessment and continued to press Cockcroft on the neutron issue. After being asked several times, he eventually stated that in his opinion, he was "90 percent certain" they were from fusion. This was unwise; a statement of opinion from a Nobel prize winner was taken as a statement of fact. The next day, the Sunday newspapers were covered with the news that fusion had been achieved in ZETA, often with claims about how the UK was now far in the lead in fusion research. Cockcroft further hyped the results on television following the release, stating: "To Britain this discovery is greater than the Russian Sputnik."

As planned, the US also released a large batch of results from their smaller pinch machines. Many of them were also giving off neutrons, although ZETA was stabilised for much longer periods and generating more neutrons, by a factor of about 1000. When questioned about the success in the UK, Strauss denied that the US was behind in the fusion race. When reporting on the topic, The New York Times chose to focus on Los Alamos' Columbus II, only mentioning ZETA later in the article, and then concluded the two countries were "neck and neck." Other reports from the US generally gave equal support to both programmes. Newspapers from the rest of the world were more favourable to the UK; Radio Moscow went so far to publicly congratulate the UK while failing to mention the US results at all.

As ZETA continued to generate positive results, plans were made to build a follow-on machine. The new design was announced in May; ZETA II would be a significantly larger US$14 million machine whose explicit goal would be to reach 100 million K, and generate net power. This announcement gathered praise even in the US; The New York Times ran a story about the new version. Machines similar to ZETA were being announced around the world; Osaka University announced their pinch machine was even more successful than ZETA, the Aldermaston team announced positive results from their Sceptre machine costing only US$28,000, and a new reactor was built in Uppsala University that was presented publicly later that year. The Efremov Institute in Leningrad began construction of a smaller version of ZETA, although still larger than most, known as Alpha.

Further scepticism, retraction of claims 

Spitzer had already concluded that known theory suggested that the ZETA was nowhere near the temperatures the team was claiming, and during the publicity surrounding the release of the work, he suggested that "Some unknown mechanism would appear to be involved". Other researchers in the US, notably Furth and Colgate, were far more critical, telling anyone who would listen that the results were bunk. In the Soviet Union, Lev Artsimovich rushed to have the Nature article translated, and after reading it, declared "Chush sobachi!" (bullshit).

Cockcroft had stated that they were receiving too few neutrons from the device to measure their spectrum or their direction. Failing to do so meant they could not eliminate the possibility that the neutrons were being released due to electrical effects in the plasma, the sorts of reactions that Kurchatov had pointed out earlier. Such measurements would have been easy to make.

In the same converted hangar that housed ZETA was the Harwell Synchrocyclotron effort run by Basil Rose. This project had built a sensitive high-pressure diffusion cloud chamber as the cyclotron's main detector. Rose was convinced it would be able to directly measure the neutron energies and trajectories. In a series of experiments, he showed that the neutrons had a high directionality, at odds with a fusion origin which would be expected to be randomly directed. To further demonstrate this he had the machine run "backwards", with the electric current running in the opposite direction. This demonstrated a clear difference in the number of neutrons and their energy, which suggested they were a result of the electrical current itself, not fusion reactions inside the plasma.

This was followed by similar experiments on Perhapsatron and Columbus, demonstrating the same problems. The issue was a new form of instability, the "microinstabilities" or MHD instabilities, that were caused by wave-like signals in the plasma. These had been predicted, but whereas the kink was on the scale of the entire plasma and could be easily seen in photographs, these microinstabilities were too small and rapidly moving to easily detect, and had simply not been noticed before. But like the kink, when these instabilities developed, areas of enormous electrical potential developed, rapidly accelerating protons in the area. These sometimes collided with neutrons in the plasma or the container walls, ejecting them through neutron spallation. This is the same physical process that had been creating neutrons in earlier designs, the problem Cockcroft had mentioned during the press releases, but their underlying cause was more difficult to see and in ZETA they were much more powerful. The promise of stabilised pinch disappeared.

Cockcroft was forced to publish a humiliating retraction on 16 May 1958, claiming "It is doing exactly the job we expected it would do and is functioning exactly the way we hoped it would." Le Monde raised the issue to a front-page headline in June, noting "Contrary to what was announced six months ago at Harwell – British experts confirm that thermonuclear energy has not been 'domesticated. The event cast a chill over the entire field; it was not only the British who looked foolish, every other country involved in fusion research had been quick to jump on the bandwagon.

Harwell in turmoil, ZETA soldiers on 
Beginning in 1955, Cockcroft had pressed for the establishment of a new site for the construction of multiple prototype power-producing fission reactors. This was strongly opposed by Christopher Hinton, and a furious debate broke out within the UKAEA over the issue. Cockcroft eventually won the debate, and in late 1958 the UKAEA formed AEE Winfrith in Dorset, where they eventually built several experimental reactor designs.

Cockcroft had also pressed for the ZETA II reactor to be housed at the new site. He argued that Winfrith would be better suited to build the large reactor, and the unclassified site would better suit the now-unclassified research. This led to what has been described as "as close to a rebellion that the individualistic scientists at Harwell could possibly mount". Thonemann made it clear he was not interested in moving to Dorset and suggested that several other high-ranking members would also quit rather than move. He then went on sabbatical to Princeton University for a year. The entire affair was a major strain on Basil Schonland, who took over the Research division when Cockcroft left in October 1959 to become the Master of the newly formed Churchill College, Cambridge.

While this was taking place, the original ZETA II proposal had been growing ever-larger, eventually specifying currents as powerful as the Joint European Torus that was built years later. As it seemed this was beyond the state-of-the-art, the project was eventually cancelled in February 1959. A new proposal soon took its place, the Intermediate-Current Stability Experiment (ICSE). ICSE was designed to take advantage of further stabilising effects noticed in M-theory, which suggested that very fast pinches would cause the current to flow only in the outer layer of the plasma, which should be much more stable. Over time, this machine grew to be about the same size as ZETA; ICSE had a 6 m major diameter and 1 m minor diameter, powered by a bank of capacitors storing 10 MJ at 100 kV.

Harwell was as unsuited to ICSE as it was for ZETA II, so Schonland approached the government with the idea of a new site for fusion research located close to Harwell. He was surprised to find they were happy with the idea, as this would limit employment at Harwell, whose payroll roster was becoming too complex to manage. Further study demonstrated that the cost of building a new site would be offset by the savings in keeping the site near Harwell; if ICSE was built at Winfrith, the travel costs between the sites would be considerable. ICSE construction began later that year, starting with a one-acre building to house it, known as "D-1".

Meanwhile, work continued on ZETA to better understand what was causing the new forms of instabilities. New diagnostic techniques demonstrated that the electron energies were very low, on the order of 10 eV (approximately 100,000 K) while ion temperatures were somewhat higher at 100 eV. Both of these pointed to a rapid loss of energy in the plasma, which in turn suggested the fuel was turbulent and escaping confinement to hit the walls of the chamber where it rapidly cooled. A full presentation of the results was made at the Salzburg Conference in 1961, where the Soviet delegation presented very similar results on their ZETA-clone, Alpha.

The source of this turbulence was not clearly identified at that time, but the team suggested it was due to current-driven resistive modes; if one did not use the simplifying assumption that the plasma had no macroscopic resistance, new instabilities would naturally appear. When the new head of the UKAEA, William Penney, heard that the ICSE design was also based on the resistance-free assumption, he cancelled the project in August 1960. Parts for the partially-assembled reactor were scavenged by other teams.

Thonemann had returned by this point and found much to disagree with on ICSE. He demanded to be allowed to set up a new fusion group to remain at Harwell on ZETA. ZETA remained the largest toroidal machine in the world for some time, and went on to have a productive career for just over a decade, but in spite of its later successes ZETA was always known as an example of British folly.

Thomson scattering and tokamaks 

ZETA's failure was due to limited information; using the best available measurements, ZETA was returning several signals that suggested the neutrons were due to fusion. The original temperature measures were made by examining the Doppler shifting of the spectral lines of the atoms in the plasma. The inaccuracy of the measurement and spurious results caused by electron impacts with the container led to misleading measurements based on the impurities, not the plasma itself. Over the next decade, ZETA was used continuously in an effort to develop better diagnostic tools to resolve these problems.

This work eventually developed a method that is used to this day. The introduction of lasers provided a new solution through a British discovery known as Thomson scattering. Lasers have extremely accurate and stable frequency control, and the light they emit interacts strongly with free electrons. A laser shone into the plasma will be reflected off the electrons, and during this process will be Doppler shifted by the electrons' movement. The speed of the electrons is a function of their temperature, so by comparing the frequency before and after collisions, the temperature of the electrons could be measured with an extremely high degree of accuracy. By "reversing" the system, the temperature of the ions could also be directly measured.

Through the 1960s ZETA was not the only experiment to suffer from unexpected performance problems. Problems with plasma diffusion across the magnetic fields plagued both the magnetic mirror and stellarator programs, at rates that classical theory could not explain. Adding more fields did not appear to correct the problems in any of the existing designs. Work slowed dramatically as teams around the world tried to better understand the physics of the plasmas in their devices. Pfirsch and Schluter were the first to make a significant advance, suggesting that much larger and more powerful machines would be needed to correct these problems. An attitude of pessimism took root across the entire field.

In 1968 a meeting of fusion researchers took place in Novosibirsk, where, to everyone's astonishment, the Soviet hosts introduced their work on their tokamak designs which had performance numbers that no other experiment was even close to matching. The latest of their designs, the T-3, was producing electron energies of 1000 eV, compared to about 10 eV in ZETA. This corresponded to a plasma temperature of about 10 million K. Although the Soviet team was highly respected, the results were so good that there was serious concern their indirect temperature measurements might be unreliable and they had fallen prey to a measurement problem like the one that had occurred with ZETA. Spitzer, once again, expressed his scepticism rather strongly, sparking off an acrimonious debate with Artsimovich.

The Soviets were equally concerned about this, and even though it was the height of the Cold War, Artsimovich invited UKAEA to bring their laser system to the Kurchatov Institute and independently measure the performance. Artsimovich had previously called their system "brilliant." The team became known as "the Culham five", performing a series of measurements in late 1968 and early 1969. The resulting paper was published in November 1969 and convinced the fusion research field that the tokamak was indeed reaching the levels of performance the Soviets claimed. The result was a "veritable stampede" of tokamak construction around the world, and it remains the most studied device in the fusion field.

Tokamaks are toroidal pinch machines. The key difference is the relative strengths of the fields. In the stabilised pinch machines, most of the magnetic field in the plasma was generated by the current induced in it. The strength of the external stabilisation fields was much lower and only penetrated into the outer layers of the plasma mass. The tokamak reversed this; the external magnets were much more powerful and the plasma current greatly reduced in comparison. Artsimovich put it this way:

This difference is today part of a general concept known as the safety factor, denoted q. A ZETA-type machine could reach this q, but would require enormously powerful external magnets to match the equally large fields being generated by the current. The tokamak approach resolved this by using less pinch current; this made the system stable but meant the current could no longer be used to heat the plasma. Tokamak designs require some form of external heating.

Reversed field pinch 

In 1965, the newly opened Culham laboratory hosted what had become a periodic meeting of international fusion researchers. Of all the work presented, only two papers on stabilised pinch were present, both on ZETA. Spitzer did not mention them during the opening comments.

Normally, the pulse of electricity sent into ZETA formed a current pulse with a shape similar to a Poisson distribution, ramping up quickly then trailing off. One of the papers noted that the plasma stability reached a maximum just after the current began to taper off, and then lasted longer than the current pulse itself. This phenomenon was dubbed "quiescence".

Three years later, at the same meeting where Soviet results with the T-3 tokamak were first released, a paper by Robinson and King examined the quiescence period. They determined it was due to the original toroidal magnetic field reversing itself, creating a more stable configuration. At the time, the enormity of the T-3 results overshadowed this result.

John Bryan Taylor took up the issue and began a detailed theoretical study of the concept, publishing a groundbreaking 1974 article on the topic. He demonstrated that as the magnetic field that generated the pinch was relaxing, it interacted with the pre-existing stabilising fields, creating a self-stable magnetic field. The phenomenon was driven by the system's desire to preserve magnetic helicity, which suggested a number of ways to improve the confinement time.

Although the stabilising force was lower than the force available in the pinch, it lasted considerably longer. It appeared that a reactor could be built that would approach the Lawson criterion from a different direction, using extended confinement times rather than increased density. This was similar to the stellarator approach in concept, and although it would have lower field strength than those machines, the energy needed to maintain the confinement was much lower. Today this approach is known as the reversed field pinch (RFP) and has been a field of continued study.

Taylor's study of the relaxation into the reversed state led to his development of a broader theoretical understanding of the role of magnetic helicity and minimum energy states, greatly advancing the understanding of plasma dynamics. The minimum-energy state, known as the "Taylor state", is particularly important in the understanding of new fusion approaches in the compact toroid class. Taylor went on to study the ballooning transformation, a problem that was occurring in the latest high-performance toroidal machines as large-scale waveforms formed in the plasma. His work in fusion research won him the 1999 James Clerk Maxwell Prize for Plasma Physics.

Demolition 
Culham officially opened in 1965, and various teams began leaving the former sites through this period. A team kept ZETA operational until September 1968. Hangar 7, which housed ZETA and other machines, was demolished during financial year 2005/2006.

Notes

References

Citations

Bibliography

External links 
 Britain's Sputnik – BBC Radio 4 programme on ZETA first broadcast on 16 January 2008
 ZETA – Peace Atoms, contemporary newsreel story on the reactor.
 

Magnetic confinement fusion devices
Nuclear power in the United Kingdom
Nuclear research institutes in the United Kingdom
Nuclear research reactors
Nuclear technology in the United Kingdom
Research institutes in Oxfordshire
Vale of White Horse